Lawrence Owino (born 15 October 1982) is a retired Kenyan football midfielder who played for Ulinzi Stars.

References

1982 births
Living people
Kenyan footballers
Kenya international footballers
Ulinzi Stars F.C. players
Association football midfielders